Flávio Dino de Castro e Costa (born 30 April 1968) is a Brazilian attorney, politician and teacher. A former federal judge, Dino was elected to the Chamber of Deputies in 2006 under the Communist Party banner, serving a four-year term until 2011, representing the state of Maranhão. He was elected as the governor of Maranhão after running in the 2014 election. He became the governor of Maranhão on 1 January 2015. He was reelected in 2018. In 2021, Dino left the Communist Party to joined the Socialist Party, and was appointed Minister of Justice by President Lula.

Dino also served 3 years as president of Embratur, a federal agency promoting Brazilian tourism, between his legislative term and gubernatorial term. Dino was considered a leading left-wing candidate in the 2022 presidential election but chose to forgo a candidacy, instead choosing to run for Senate.

Early life and family 
Flávio Dino de Castro e Costa was born in São Luís on 30 April 1968.

Flávio graduated with a bachelor's degree in 1991, and returned to the Federal University of Maranhão in 1993 as a professor. While working as a professor, Dino got involved with the university's activist scene, and later began advising the university's workers unions.

Political career

Federal judge 
Starting in 1994, Dino was elected as a federal judge.

From 2000 to 2002, he served as the chair of the National Association of Federal Judges (AJUFE). During his time as a judge, Dino also served as the Secretary-General of the National Council of Justice (CNJ).

In 2006, he resigned from his position as a judge, and decided to devote himself to politics instead.

2008 São Luís mayoral election 
In 2008, he ran for election as the mayor of São Luís, but was defeated by João Castelo of the Brazilian Social Democracy Party (PSDB).

2010 Maranhão gubernatorial election 
Flávio Dino ran in the 2010 Maranhão gubernatorial election, but lost to Roseana Sarney of the Brazilian Democratic Movement.

2014 Maranhão gubernatorial election 
Dino ran again in the 2014 Maranhão gubernatorial election. He campaigned on promises of anti-corruption, expanding clean water access, launching a housing construction and renovation program, and improving public security. In 2014, he was elected as the state's governor in the first round of the election, with 63.52 percent of the valid votes.

2018 Maranhão gubernatorial election 

2022 Maranhão senatorial election 
Dino resigned as the governor of Maranhão on 2 April 2022, in order to run in the 2022 Maranhão gubernatorial election as a candidate for the Federal Senate.

References 

Governors of Maranhão
Living people
Communist Party of Brazil politicians
Workers' Party (Brazil) politicians
Brazilian Democratic Movement politicians
1968 births
People from São Luís, Maranhão
Ministers of Justice of Brazil